Manukau East was a New Zealand parliamentary electorate that returned one member of parliament to the House of Representatives.

Population centres
In 2007, large changes were made to the Manukau East electorate. Its northern boundary extended past the Tamaki River to almost as far as Sylvia Park Rd to incorporate Middlemore, Otahuhu and Westfield. Its eastern boundary shifted west to East Tamaki Rd resulting in East Tamaki and Botany Downs being included in the new Botany electorate. Most of Otara and Papatoetoe West are now also included in the electorate.

In the 2013 electorate boundary review, it was found that Manukau East electorate was above quota (based on the 2013 census). The draft proposal by the Representation Commission sees some population at Westfield to be transferred to the  electorate.

History

It has been represented by two MPs, both of the Labour Party, Ross Robertson and Jenny Salesa. It was considered one of Labour's safest electorates. On 6 June 2013 Robertson announced that he would retire from Parliament in order to pursue a career in local body politics. Jenny Salesa replaced him, with a comfortable, although smaller, majority of 13,254.

During the 2020 electorate adjustment, the electorate was replaced with Panmure-Ōtāhuhu.

Members of Parliament
Unless otherwise stated, all MPs terms began and ended at general elections.

Key

List MPs

Election results

2017 election

2014 election

2011 election

Electorate (as at 26 November 2011): 41,901

2008 election

2005 election

2002 election

1999 election

1996 election

Notes

References

External links
Electorate Profile  Parliamentary Library

Historical electorates of New Zealand
Politics of the Auckland Region
1996 establishments in New Zealand